"youthful beautiful" is Japanese voice actress and singer Maaya Uchida's 8th single, released on October 17, 2018. The titular song from the single was used as the ending theme for the anime SSSS.Gridman.

Track listings

Charts

Event 
 『 Maaya Party！8』　Maaya Uchida 8th Single Release Event「Maaya Party！8」（November 3, 2018 - November 24, 2018：Osaka, Aichi, Tokyo）

Album

References

2018 singles
2018 songs
J-pop songs
Japanese-language songs
Pony Canyon singles
Anime songs